Imre Csermelyi (born 29 August 1988, in Kapuvár) is a Hungarian football player who currently plays for Lombard-Pápa TFC.

External links 
"10.12. Ötödik győzelmükre készülnek – Győri ETO FC" at ETO.hu
"Csermelyi Imre" at HLSZ

1988 births
Living people
People from Kapuvár
Hungarian footballers
Association football forwards
Győri ETO FC players
Gyirmót FC Győr players
BFC Siófok players
Lombard-Pápa TFC footballers
Sportspeople from Győr-Moson-Sopron County